Haberlandia isiroensis is a moth in the family Cossidae. It is found in the Democratic Republic of the Congo. The habitat consists of forests.

The wingspan is about 24.5 mm. The forewings are colonial buff with isabella colour lines and striae. The hindwings are light yellowish olive with a reticulated (net-like) isabella colour pattern.

Etymology
The species is named for Isiro, the type locality.

References

Natural History Museum Lepidoptera generic names catalog

Moths described in 2011
Metarbelinae
Taxa named by Ingo Lehmann
Endemic fauna of the Democratic Republic of the Congo